Rolf Trygve Busch (15 November 1920 – 18 December 2016)  was a Norwegian diplomat and ambassador.

Biography
He was born at Spydeberg in  Østfold, Norway. He was the son of  Aksel Busch (1887-1948) and Alette Tunby (1885-1977). He was awarded his  cand.jur. degree from the University of Oslo in 1946. He was hired in the Ministry of Foreign Affairs in 1947, and was promoted to assistant secretary in 1960 and sub-director in 1963. He served as an embassy counsellor at the Norwegian NATO embassy from 1965 to 1971, deputy under-secretary of state in the Ministry of Foreign Affairs briefly in 1971 before serving as the Norwegian ambassador to NATO from 1971 to 1977, to West Germany from 1977 to 1982 and to the United Kingdom from 1982 to 1989.

References

1920 births
2016 deaths
People from Spydeberg
University of Oslo alumni
Norwegian civil servants
Permanent Representatives of Norway to NATO
Ambassadors of Norway to West Germany
Ambassadors of Norway to the United Kingdom